The Hacklander Site, also designated 20AE78, is an archaeological site located on the south shore of the Kalamazoo River east of Douglas, Michigan. It was added to the National Register of Historic Places in 1973.  The site is significant because it represents much of what is understood about Woodland period life in the region.

The Hacklander site is a large multi-component Middle Woodland period site, likely representing an ongoing seasonal occupation of the site. It was discovered in the 1960s. Over two years of excavations, researchers discovered more than 20,000 ceramic potsherds, as well as 80,000 stone artifacts (including Woodland points) and debitage. Construction of a river access site by the Michigan Department of Natural Resources at the location has had a major impact on the site.

References

Further reading

Archaeological sites on the National Register of Historic Places in Michigan
National Register of Historic Places in Allegan County, Michigan